Edmond is a 2005 American thriller film directed by Stuart Gordon and starring William H. Macy, based on the 1982 play Edmond by David Mamet. Mamet also wrote the screenplay for the film. Edmond features Julia Stiles, Rebecca Pidgeon, Denise Richards, Mena Suvari, Joe Mantegna, Bai Ling, Jeffrey Combs, Dylan Walsh and George Wendt in supporting roles. It was screened at several film festivals from September 2005 to May 2006, and had a limited release on July 14, 2006.

Plot 
Edmond Burke is a middle-aged New York City businessman who visits a tarot fortune teller on the way home. The fortune teller, a little startled, tells him that "you are not where you belong". He decides to make changes in his life, beginning by leaving his wife. At a bar, Edmond tells a fellow patron that he has not had sex in a while and that marriage took away his masculinity. The man gives him the address to a strip club, where Edmond is kicked out by a bouncer for not paying for a stripper's drink. Now even more sexually frustrated, Edmond goes to a peep show; having never been to such a place before, he is disappointed when he realizes that he is not allowed to have actual sex with the performer.

Next Edmond goes to a white-collar bordello, but cannot afford a hooker. He needs money, so he plays a three-card Monte game with a street dealer. When Edmond accuses the dealer of cheating, the dealer and his shill beat him up and steal his money. Edmond becomes enraged by what he sees as the contempt, prejudice and greed of society. He pawns his wedding ring in exchange for a knife. He is approached by a pimp who offers Edmond a "clean girl" and lures him to an alleyway, where the pimp attempts to mug him. In a wild rage, Edmond attacks the pimp with his knife while hurling racial slurs at him. He leaves him wounded and possibly dying in the alley.

Suddenly euphoric, Edmond enters a coffee shop and tells a young waitress, Glenna, his newfound worldview of instant gratification. They end up having sex at her apartment. Glenna likes him at first, but she is soon frightened by his increasingly erratic behavior and calls for help. An enraged Edmond slashes her to death, blaming her own insecurity for her murder. On a subway train, he has an angry confrontation with a female passenger. Edmond comes across a church service where a minister preaches about respect and faith. Edmond feels the urge to preach about his own experiences, and as he stands in the doorway of the church, the woman from the subway recognizes him and calls into the street for the police. The responding officer pats Edmond down to find the knife in his front jacket pocket. Edmond is arrested.

In jail, Edmond begins to appreciate the security of his old life, but it is too late; the police have reason to believe that the knife found in Edmond's pocket may be the weapon used in Glenna's murder. The interrogating officer bluntly asks Edmond why he killed Glenna, to Edmond's shock and disbelief. He is sent to prison for her murder. There, Edmond is paired with a black cellmate. He likes prison because it is simple. He speaks of how he has always feared black people, but now that he shares a room with one, he can finally feel a bond. The indifferent cellmate then forces Edmond to perform oral sex on him. Edmond tells a prison minister what happened, but goes off on a tangent, shouting that God has been unfair to him. When the minister asks why he murdered the waitress, he has no answer.

Years pass. Edmond has cut connections with the outside world, refusing to see visitors. He talks to his cellmate, with whom he has developed a relationship, about the human ego and how life should not be taken for granted. He concludes that by conquering his fears, he might lead a better life. Both men ponder the afterlife. Edmond then goes to sleep comfortably alongside his cellmate. True to the tarot fortune teller's words, Edmond might well have found the place where he belongs.

Cast

William H. Macy as Edmond Burke
Frances Bay as Fortune Teller
Patricia Belcher as Subway Woman
Jeffrey Combs as Desk Clerk
Barry Cullison as Pawn Shop Customer
Vincent Guastaferro as Club Manager
Dulé Hill as Sharper
Aldis Hodge as Leafletter
Russell Hornsby as Shill
Matt Landers as Bystander
Bai Ling as Peep Show Girl
Joe Mantegna as man in bar
Debi Mazar as Matron
Rebecca Pidgeon as Mrs. Burke
Denise Richards as B-Girl
Michael Saad as Library Guard
Lionel Mark Smith as Pimp
Julia Stiles as Glenna
Mena Suvari as Whore
Marcus Thomas as Window Man
Wendy Thompson as Cocktail Waitress
Jack Wallace as Chaplain
Dylan Walsh as Interrogator
George Wendt as Pawn Shop Owner
Bokeem Woodbine as Edmond's cellmate
Bruce A. Young as Policeman

Reception 
The film received mixed reviews from critics. The review aggregator website Rotten Tomatoes reported that 47% of critics gave the film positive reviews, based on 74 reviews. The website's consensus reads, "Despite an electrifying performance by William H. Macy, David Mamet's one-act morality play translates poorly into a film that is overburdened by dialogue." Metacritic reported the film had an average score of 61 out of 100, based on 21 reviews, indicating "Generally favorable reviews".

The New York Times film critic Stephen Holden said:

Awards

Wins and nominations

References

External links 
 
 
 
 
 
 

American films based on plays
2005 films
2000s English-language films
2005 thriller films
American crime drama films
2005 crime thriller films
American crime thriller films
American thriller drama films
Films with screenplays by David Mamet
Films directed by Stuart Gordon
Films based on works by David Mamet
2000s American films